James Murdock (1776–1856) was an American biblical scholar, born in Westbrook, Connecticut.

He made the first translation of the New Testament from the Syriac Peshitta into English in 1851.

Works
 The Syriac New Testament Translated into English from the Peshitto Version URL

References

Translators of the Bible into English
Syriac literature
1776 births
1856 deaths